John Gilbert (Jack) Higgins (May 7, 1891 – July 1, 1963) was a Newfoundland politician, Senator and lawyer.

Early life
Jack had an older sister, May. He was a child when his father died. Jack was educated from the age of five at Saint Bonaventure's College and was selected one of Newfoundland's Rhodes Scholars in 1909. He studied law at Merton College, Oxford and was captain of the Oxford-Canadian ice hockey team which toured Europe and was undefeated in its 17 matches, outscoring its opponents 204 goals to 17.

Career
In 1913 he was called to the bar of Newfoundland and England and began practicing law in St. John's, Newfoundland. In 1916, he joined the Canadian Corps's St. Francis Xavier Hospital Unit and served for the remainder of World War I in England and France. After the war, Higgins returned to Newfoundland and established a law partnership with Harry Winter in 1919.

Political ambitions
During the Newfoundland National Convention, Higgins opposed Joey Smallwood's resolution that Newfoundland join Canadian Confederation. He became a leading member of the Responsible Government League and campaigned against joining Canada in the 1948 Newfoundland referendums. When Newfoundland joined Canada on March 31, 1949, Higgins hung black crepe on his door as a symbol of mourning.

In Newfoundland's first provincial election on May 27, 1949, Higgins was elected to the Newfoundland House of Assembly as a Progressive Conservative from St. John's East. As party leader Harry Mews failed to win his seat, Higgins became the province's first Leader of the Opposition. Preferring his legal practice to politics, Higgins did not run for re-election in 1951.

On January 15, 1959, Prime Minister John Diefenbaker appointed Higgins as Newfoundland's first Progressive Conservative member of the Senate of Canada, where he served until his death in 1963.

References

External links

1891 births
1963 deaths
Ice hockey people from Newfoundland and Labrador
Newfoundland Rhodes Scholars
Progressive Conservative Party of Newfoundland and Labrador MHAs
Politicians from St. John's, Newfoundland and Labrador
Sportspeople from St. John's, Newfoundland and Labrador
Canadian senators from Newfoundland and Labrador
Alumni of Merton College, Oxford
Canadian Army personnel
Canadian military personnel of World War I
Newfoundland and Labrador political party leaders
Canadian sportsperson-politicians
Dominion of Newfoundland people